The 1948–49 Iraq FA Basra League was the first season of the Iraq FA Basra League (the top division of football in Basra from 1948 to 1973), which was formed when the Basra branch of the newly founded Iraq Football Association took over the existing league competition in Basra (the Students League Cup).

The competition started in November 1948, with the regular season being played in a round-robin format. Al-Minaa and Sharikat Naft Al-Basra qualified for the final in May 1949 by occupying the top two positions in the league table, and Al-Minaa were crowned inaugural Iraq FA Basra League champions with a 1–0 victory, preventing their opponents from completing a Basra League and Iraq FA Cup double.

Regular season

Known results

Final

References

External links
 Iraqi Football Website

Iraq FA Basra League seasons
Iraq
1948 in Iraqi sport
1949 in Iraqi sport